Isochem is a French chemicals company specializing in custom synthesis. It was established in France in 1974.

Timeline and history
 1974: Isochem created in Gennevilliers
 1977: Pithiviers (ex. Agrifarm) site opened
 1979: 1st  U.S. Food and Drug Administration (FDA) audit and approval; export market development
 1990: Isochem joins 
 1991: Isochem acquires the Vert-le-Petit site (ex IRCHA Fine Chemicals and Propeptide)
 2003: acquisition of the Pont-de-Claix platform and the Hungarian subsidiary Framochem  
 2010: acquisition of Isochem by the German industrial holding company 
 2012: acquisition of Wychem (UK) by Isochem ,
 2014: sale of Framochem subsidiary by Isochem
 2016: sale of Wychem subsidiary by Isochem

Initially specialized in the extraction and hemisynthesis of natural substances such as quinine, Isochem has gradually expanded its expertise in the field of multi-step industrial production 
 encompassing a variety of operations including Grignard, Friedel-Crafts, Sandmeyer, Vilsmeier-Haack Reaction, deprotonation using butyllithium, reduction using metal hydrides and hydrogenation.

In the 1990s, synergies with Groupe SNPE enabled Isochem to implement new technologies such as phosgenation, nitration, and manufacture of amino-acid derivatives such as NCAs, UNCAs, and peptides.,

Industrial sites and specific expertise 

Some sites in France:
 Vert-le-Petit :(head office and production): phosgene chemistry   
 Gennevilliers: fractioned distillation, cold reactions (-70 °C)  
 Pithiviers: hydrogenation under pressure, waste processing 
 Pont de Claix : active ingredients and intermediates for Agrochemicals.

Most industrial sites have a research and development team; in addition, the Vert-le-Petit site has the equipment required to study process safety.

References

External links 
  Official Website Isochem

Chemical companies of France
Companies based in Île-de-France